VUS or Vus may refer to:

Variant of uncertain significance in genetic testing
Vus (Crna Trava), village in Serbia
Vjesnik u srijedu, Croatian newspaper
Veliky Ustyug Airport
All-Russian Teachers' Union (Russian: Vserossiiskii soiuz uchitelei)